The Punjabi Language Movement (PLM) is a linguistic movement in Punjab, Pakistan aimed at reviving the Punjabi language, art, culture and literature in Pakistan. The Punjabi people constitute the largest ethnic group in Pakistan though Urdu is the national language and unlike Indian Punjab (where reading/writing Punjabi language is compulsory at every level from 2008 alongside a special Punjabi University at Patiala), Punjabi itself does not have an official status. The PLM's ideologies are based on Punjabi nationalism.

See also
Punjabi nationalism
Punjabi Suba movement
Punjabiyat
Anti-Hindi agitation of 1937–40

References

External links 
Punjabi Language Movement Official website
Official Facebook
PLM on Youtube

Politics of Punjab, Pakistan
Punjabi language
Organisations based in Lahore
Language policy in Pakistan
Linguistic rights
Linguistic controversies
Punjabi nationalism
Language conflict in Pakistan